Alteraurantiacibacter aestuarii is a Gram-negative and aerobic bacterium from the genus Alteraurantiacibacter which has been isolated from seawater from the South Sea in Korea.

References

External links
Type strain of Altererythrobacter aestuarii at BacDive -  the Bacterial Diversity Metadatabase

Sphingomonadales
Bacteria described in 2011